Kalladi or Kallady may refer to:
 Kaladi (caste), is a subcaste of Devendrakula Velalar an agricultural community found in the Indian state of Tamil Nadu.
 Kalladi (Batticaloa), a village in Batticaloa District, Sri Lanka
 Kalladi (Jaffna), a village in Northern Province, Sri Lanka
 Kallady Bridge, Batticaloa District, Sri Lanka
 MES Kalladi College, Mannarkkad, Palakkad district, Kerala, India
 Kevin Kallady (1923–2008), Australian rules footballer

See also
 Kalady, a village in Kerala, India